Amt Rhinow is an Amt ("collective municipality") in the district of Havelland, in Brandenburg, Germany. Its seat is in Rhinow.

The Amt Rhinow consists of the following municipalities:
Gollenberg
Großderschau
Havelaue
Kleßen-Görne
Rhinow
Seeblick

Demography

References 

Rhinow
Havelland (district)